This is a list of members from American blues rock band Canned Heat.  Members of the band's classic eras are in bold.

Current members 
 Adolfo "Fito" de la Parra drums, vocals (1967–present)
John Paulus guitar (2000–2006, 2013–present)
 Dale Wesley Spalding guitar, harmonica, bass, vocals (2008–present)
 Rick Reed bass (2019-present)

Former members 

 Bob "The Bear" Hite – vocals, harmonica, guitar (1965–1981; died 1981)
 Alan "Blind Owl" Wilson – guitar, harmonica, vocals (1965–1970; died 1970)
 Stuart Brotman – bass (1965–1966)
 Mike Perlowin – guitar (1965; died 2021)
 Keith Sawyer – drums (1965)
 Kenny Edwards – guitar (1965; died 2010)
 Ron Holmes – drums (1965)
 Henry "The Sunflower" Vestine – guitar (1965–1969, 1970-74, 1980–1981, 1985–1988, 1992–1997; died 1997)
 Frank Cook – drums (1965–1967; died 2021)
 Mark Andes – bass (1966–1967)
 Larry "The Mole" Taylor bass, guitar, vocals (1967–1970, 1978–1980, 1987–1992, 1996–1997, 2010–2019; died 2019)
 Harvey "The Snake" Mandel – guitar (1969–1970, 1990–1992, 1996–1999, 2010–2014)
 Antonio de la Barreda – bass (1970–1972; died 2009)
 Joel Scott Hill – guitar (1970–1972)
 Richard Hite – bass, guitar, vocals (1972–1977; died 2001)
 James Shane – guitar, bass, vocals (1972–1974)
 Ed Beyer – keyboards (1972–1974)
 Clifford Solomon – saxophone (1972–1974; died 2004)
 Jock Ellis – trombone (1972–1974)
 Chris Morgan – guitar (1974–1977)
 Gene Taylor – keyboards, guitar (1974–1976; died 2021)
 Stan Webb – guitar (1976)
 Mark Skyer – guitar (1976–1977)

 Richard Exley – bass (1977–1978)
 Mike "Hollywood Fats" Mann – guitar (1978–1980; died 1986)
 Ronnie Barron – keyboards (1978, 1987–1988; died 1997)
 Jay Spell – keyboards (1978–1980; died 2010)
 Mike Halby – guitar (1978–1984; died 2008)
 Jon Lamb – bass (1980)
 Ernie Rodriguez – bass (1980–1985)
 Richard Kellogg – vocals, harmonica (1981–1985; died 2008)
 Walter Trout – guitar (1981–1985)
 James Thornbury – vocals, guitar, harmonica (1985–1995; died 2017)
 Skip Jones – bass (1985–1987)
 Junior Watson – guitar (1988–1990, 1992–1997)
 Ron Shumake – bass (1990–1996; died 2014)
 Becky Barksdale – guitar (1992)
 Smokey Hormel – guitar (1992)
 Robert Lucas – vocals, slide guitar, harmonica (1995–2000, 2005–2008; died 2008)
 Mark "Pocket" Goldberg – bass (1996)
 Jacob Montreal – keyboards (1996; died 2001)
 Tim "Bird" Pigeon – slapbass (1996; died 1997)
 Greg Kage – bass (1996–2010)
 Paul Bryant – guitar (1997–2000)
 Stanley "The Baron" Behrens – saxophone, flute, harmonica, vocals (2000–2005)
 Dallas Hodge – vocals, guitars (2000–2005)
 Don Preston – vocals, guitar (2005)
 Barry Levenson – guitar (2006–2010)

Lineups

Timeline

References

Canned Heat